Milstein may refer to:
The Milstein method in mathematics

People
Adam Milstein, Israeli-American real estate investor and philanthropist
Beth Milstein, producer/writer
César Milstein (1927-2002), scientist, recipient of the Nobel Prize in Physiology or Medicine in 1984
Cindy Milstein, activist
David Milstein, chemist
Howard Milstein Chairman and CEO of the Milstein family real estate companies and New York Private Bank & Trust; third generation leader of the prominent business and philanthropic family
Nathan Milstein (1903-1992), Ukrainian-born violinist and composer
Ohad Milstein artist/filmmaker/photographer
Paul Milstein real estate developer and philanthropist
Seymour Milstein real estate developer and philanthropist
Silvina Milstein composer
Uri Milstein historian/poet
The Milstein family, owners of Emigrant Savings Bank

Yiddish-language surnames